Sardinella lemuru (Bali sardinella) is a species of ray-finned fish in the genus Sardinella found in the Eastern Indian Ocean and in the Western Pacific Ocean, in the area that stretches from southern Japan through the Malay Archipelago to the western Australia.

Commercial Uses
Bali sardinella is an important species used in Indonesian feed mills to supply shrimp feed, as well as in imported fishmeal. Bali sardinella is also eaten fresh or processed. Processed Bali sardinella may be found as canned, boiled-salted, or fish flakes.

References

External links
 Scaly Mackerel @ Fishes of Australia

lemuru
Marine fish of Southeast Asia
Marine fish of Western Australia
Commercial fish
Fish described in 1853